Paul Maitla (born Paul Mathiesen; March 27, 1913 – May 10, 1945) was an Estonian commander in the German Waffen-SS during World War II. He is one of the four Estonians who received the Knight's Cross of the Iron Cross of Nazi Germany. He received his award for leading the recapture of the central hill of the Sinimäed during the Battle of Tannenberg Line, effectively breaking the Soviet offensive in that sector.

Early life 
	
Paul was the youngest of three children of the family. His brother died in the Estonian War of Independence, 8 years older sister had died in Estonia a few years after World War II. Paul Maitla attended elementary school in Sipe from 1921, Tartu Kommertsgümnaasium from 1927, graduating from the Poeglaste secondary school in 1934. After graduation he changed his name to Maitla.
 	
In September 1934 Maitla entered the Estonian Military School and specialised in pioneering. Maitla then entered officer training in 1937, graduating in August 1938. He was then assigned to the 3rd Infantry battalion in Valga. On Independence Day, 1939, he was commissioned by the President of Estonia to the rank of lieutenant. During 1939 and 1940 he was the State defence instructor in the secondary schools of Tartu.

World War II 

After the Soviet occupation of Estonia in 1940, Maitla was drafted into the Red Army, where he served until he was captured by the Germans in July 1941. Maitla was then interned by the Germans until November 1941, when he was released and joined the 37th Police Battalion, and tasked with guarding German airfields.

In the autumn of 1942, Maitla was promoted to lieutenant. In October, he joined the Estonian Legion. He and 113 men were sent to Poland for training. From there, he was sent to Bad Tölz for additional officer training. Maitla returned from training in 1943 and was promoted to commander of the 3rd Company of the 1st Battalion of the 45th Regiment. In April 1943, the Estonian Waffen SS brigade participated in the battles in Nevel, and he received the Iron Cross II class on 8 December for bravery.

Maitla was appointed Hauptsturmführer and in April 1944 he was commander of the 1st Battalion of the 45th Regiment of the newly formed 20th Waffen Grenadier Division of the SS (1st Estonian). In the same year, Maitla with his battalion succeeded in stopping the Red Army offensive at Auvere and received the Iron Cross I class. On 29 July, he and his battalion led a counter-attack at the Battle of Tannenberg Line for which he was awarded the Knights Cross on 23 August.

In August, Maitla was assigned to Combat group Vent, but fell ill again shortly afterwards and admitted into Tartu Hospital. He was then relocated to a hospital in Bregenz, Germany until January 1945. Maitla then rejoined the 45th regiment, which had by this time been relocated to central Europe. On April 20, 1945, he was promoted to Sturmbannführer.

The fate of Paul Maitla was uncertain for number of decades, until some information was discovered in 2005 in the city archives of the Czech town of Nymburk.  These archives show that Maitla was arrested on May 9, 1945 and killed together with 4 other Estonian soldiers after the war on May 10 by Czech communists.

Quote

Awards
Iron Cross 2nd & 1st class
Knight's Cross of the Iron Cross on 23 August 1944 as Waffen-Hauptsturmführer and leader of the I./Waffen-Grenadier-Regiment 45 of the SS (estn. Nr. 1)

See also 
Sinimäed, a documentary film based upon Paul Maitla's war diaries.

Notes

References

Citations

Bibliography

 
 

 

1913 births
1945 deaths
People from Tartu Parish
People from Kreis Dorpat
Estonian military officers
Soviet military personnel of World War II
Estonian Waffen-SS personnel
Executed Soviet collaborators with Nazi Germany
Recipients of the Knight's Cross of the Iron Cross
Nazis executed in Czechoslovakia
Extrajudicial killings in World War II
SS-Sturmbannführer